John Arnone is an American set designer. He won a Tony Award in 1993 for set designs for the production of The Who's Tommy.

Early career
John Arnone studied at SMU to become an actor. He then moved to New York with a group of friends that included Garland Wright, Jack Hefner, Powers Boothe and Kathy Bates. In 1976, Arnone started designing sets, primarily for Jack Hefner’s Vanities, which ended up running for five years. He started taking night classes at the Parsons School of Design.

Career highlights
He has done set designs for Tommy Tune, playwright Edward Albee and choreographer Twyla Tharp. He’s worked at the Guthrie, the Mark Taper Forum and the Stratford Shakespeare Festival in Ontario.

Arnone is also co-founder of the New York’s Lion Theatre Company, where he has designed numerous productions on and off Broadway.

Arnone has also designed for several television sets and films such as Mondo Beyondo with Bette Midler on HBO in 1982.

Awards
Outstanding Set Design Drama Desk Award - 1993 for production of The Who's Tommy
Tony Award for Set Design - 1993 for production of The Who's Tommy
Obie Award for Sustained Excellence in 1992 for Off-Broadway contributions to the theatrical community

Set Designs
 Volpone [Off-Broadway, 2012]
 The Lady from Dubuque [Off-Broadway, 2012]
 Black Tie [Off-Broadway, 2011]
 Nightmare Alley, Geffen Playhouse
 Oroonoko [Off-Broadway, 2008]
 Whistlin' Dixie, L.A's Geffen Playhouse, 2007
 Mimi le Duck [Off-Broadway, 2006]
 Mimi Le Duck [Off-Broadway, 2006]
 Indian Blood [Off-Broadway, 2006]
 Lennon [Broadway, 2005]
 Fortune's Fool[Broadway, 2002]
 Scenic Designer
 The Full Monty [West End, 2002]
 The Goat, or Who Is Sylvia? [Broadway, 2002]
 Dracula[Regional (US), 2001]
 The Full Monty [US Tour, 2001]
 Tiny Alice [Off-Broadway, 2000]
 The Full Monty [Broadway, 2000]
 Gore Vidal's The Best Man [Broadway, 2000]
 The Full Monty [San Diego, CA (Regional), 2000]
 Wake Up and Smell the Coffee [Off-Broadway, 2000]
 Family Week [Off-Broadway, 2000]
 The Ride Down Mt. Morgan [Broadway, 2000]
 Waste [Off-Broadway, 2000]
 The Play About the Baby [Off-Broadway, 2000]
 Minnelli on Minnelli [Broadway, 1999]
 Marlene [Broadway, 1999]
 The Ride Down Mt. Morgan [Off-Broadway, 1998]
 The Deep Blue Sea [Broadway, 1998]
 Antony and Cleopatra [Off-Broadway, 1997]
 Sex and Longing [Broadway, 1996]
 Sacrilege [Broadway, 1995]
 How to Succeed in Business Without Really Trying [Broadway, 1995]
 The Merchant of Venice [Off-Broadway, 1995]
 Grease [Broadway, 1994]
 The Best Little Whorehouse Goes Public [Broadway, 1994]
 Twilight: Los Angeles, 1992 [Broadway, 1994]
 Twilight: Los Angeles 1992 [Off-Broadway, 1994]
 Pounding Nails in the Floor [Off-Broadway, 1994]
 The Who's Tommy [Broadway, 1993]
 The End of the Day [Off-Broadway, 1992]

References

Tony Award winners
Living people
Year of birth missing (living people)
Drama Desk Award winners
Jesuit College Preparatory School of Dallas alumni